The Eustis Lake Region was a  newspaper in Eustis, Florida.

The Eustis Lake Region was first published on October 23, 1884, when Eustis was still a part of Orange County, (before the lake region of Orange County became Lake County, Florida in 1887).  Starting out as a weekly, after the paper was acquired by Ansil Daniel Miller  it joined the Associated News Service and became a daily.

References

Publications established in 1884
Weekly newspapers published in the United States
Daily newspapers published in the United States
Defunct newspapers published in Florida
Defunct companies based in Florida
1884 establishments in Florida